Meligethinae is a subfamily of pollen beetles in the family Nitidulidae. There are about 6 genera and about 10 described species in Meligethinae.

Genera
 Acanthogethes Reitter, 1871
 Afrogethes Audisio & Cline, 2009
 Brassicogethes Audisio & Cline, 2009
 Fabogethes Audisio & Cline, 2009
 Genistogethes
 Meligethes Stephens, 1830

References

 Audisio, P., A. R. Cline, A. De Biase, G. Antonini, E. Mancini, M. Trizzino, L. Costantini, et al. (2009). "Preliminary re-examination of genus-level taxonomy of the pollen beetle subfamily Meligethinae (Coleoptera: Nitidulidae)". Acta Entomologica Musei Nationalis Pragae, vol. 49, no. 2, 341–504.
 Bouchard, P., Y. Bousquet, A. Davies, M. Alonso-Zarazaga, J. Lawrence, C. Lyal, A. Newton, et al. (2011). "Family-group names in Coleoptera (Insecta)". ZooKeys, vol. 88, 1–972.
 Habeck, Dale H. / Arnett, Ross H. Jr., Michael C. Thomas, Paul E. Skelley, and J. H. Frank, eds. (2002). "Family 77. Nitidulidae Latreille 1802". American Beetles, vol. 2: Polyphaga: Scarabaeoidea through Curculionoidea, 311–315.
 Lawrence, J. F., and A. F. Newton Jr. / Pakaluk, James, and Stanislaw Adam Slipinski, eds. (1995). "Families and subfamilies of Coleoptera (with selected genera, notes, references and data on family-group names)". Biology, Phylogeny, and Classification of Coleoptera: Papers Celebrating the 80th Birthday of Roy A. Crowson, vol. 2, 779–1006.
 Parsons, Carl T. (1943). "A revision of Nearctic Nitidulidae (Coleoptera)". Bulletin of the Museum of Comparative Zoology, vol. 92, no. 3, 121–278.

Further reading

 Arnett, R. H. Jr., M. C. Thomas, P. E. Skelley and J. H. Frank. (eds.). (21 June 2002). American Beetles, Volume II: Polyphaga: Scarabaeoidea through Curculionoidea. CRC Press LLC, Boca Raton, Florida .
 Arnett, Ross H. (2000). American Insects: A Handbook of the Insects of America North of Mexico. CRC Press.
 Richard E. White. (1983). Peterson Field Guides: Beetles. Houghton Mifflin Company.

External links

 NCBI Taxonomy Browser, Meligethinae

Nitidulidae
Polyphaga subfamilies